In the United States, the investment company products/variable life contracts representative exam, is commonly referred to as the Series 6 exam. Individuals passing this multiple choice exam are licensed to sell a limited set of securities products:
 Mutual funds
 Closed-end funds on the initial offering only
 Unit investment trusts
 Variable Annuities

A Series 6 registered individual is not a stockbroker since Series 6 license holders cannot sell stock, other corporate securities, direct participation programs (DPPs), or option products.

This exam is administered by the Financial Industry Regulatory Authority (FINRA, previously known as the NASD). In order to take the exam, an individual must be sponsored by a member firm of either FINRA or a self-regulatory organization (SRO). The cost of the exam is $40.00. Individuals are allowed 90 minutes to complete 50 multiple choice questions. The passing score is 70%, and those who fail this exam must wait thirty days before taking it again.  In order to be registered with the Series 6, an individual must also pass the Securities Industry Essentials Exam (The SIE Exam). 

The table below lists the allocation of exam questions for each main job function of an investment company and variable contracts products representative.

See also
 List of securities examinations
 Series 7 exam
 Series 24 exam
 Series 63 exam
 Financial Industry Regulatory Authority (FINRA)

Sources
 Financial Industry Regulatory Authority (http://www.finra.org/industry/series6)
 http://www.series6examtutor.com  (via FINRA's series 6 content outline)

United States securities law
Professional certification in finance
Standardized tests in the United States